Yaxi is a town in Liandu District, Lishui, Zhejiang province, China. , it administers the following 19 villages:
Shanghuang Village
Zhou Village
Jilinggen Village
Panbai Village
Yali Village
Shangchen Village
Jinzhu Village
Yanmeng Village
Xiexia Village
Daihou Village
Shuangyuan Village
Shuangxi Village
Lianfang Village
Hongdu Village
Yayi Village
Xixi Village
Lidong Village
Kuchuan Village
Shangjinzhu Village

References

Township-level divisions of Zhejiang
Lishui